The 2006 Lone Star Grand Prix was the second race for the 2006 American Le Mans Series season at a temporary street course built around Reliant Park, Houston.  It took place on May 12, 2006.

Official results

Class winners in bold.  Cars failing to complete 70% of winner's distance marked as Not Classified (NC).

Statistics
 Pole Position - #16 Dyson Racing - 1:04.459
 Fastest Lap - #2 Audi Sport North America - 1:05.148
 Distance - 
 Average Speed -

External links
 

Lonestar
2006
Lone Star Grand Prix